Al Shuala (The Flame) is an Iraqi football team based in Baghdad. They will play in the Iraqi 2nd division after being relegated from the Iraqi Premier League.

External links
 Club page on Goalzz.com

Board members 

Football clubs in Iraq
Football clubs in Baghdad
Sport in Baghdad